Philhygra is a genus of beetles belonging to the family Staphylinidae.

The species of this genus are found in Europe and Northern America.

Species:
 Philhygra criddlei (Casey, 1911) 
 Philhygra homoeopyga Eppelsheim, 1893

References

Staphylinidae
Staphylinidae genera